2009 in philosophy

Events

Publications 
 Jonathan Safran Foer, Eating Animals (2009)
 David Foster Wallace, This Is Water (2009)
 Catherine H. Zuckert, Plato's Philosophers: The Coherence of the Dialogues (2009)
 Elijah Millgram, Hard Truths (2009)
 Irving Singer, Philosophy of Love: A Partial Summing-Up (2009)
 Christine Korsgaard, Self-Constitution: Agency, Identity, and Integrity (2009)
 Brian Hines, Return to the One:  Plotinus's Guide to God-Realization (2009)
 Christopher S. Hill, Consciousness (2009)

Deaths 
 January 12 - Arne Næss (born 1912)
 March 10 - Brian Barry (born 1936)
 March 16 - Marjorie Grene (born 1910)
 April 5 - Neil MacCormick (born 1941)
 May 14 - Benson Mates (born 1919)
 June 3 - Julius Moravcsik (born 1931)
 July 1 - David Pears (born 1921)
 July 17 - Leszek Kołakowski (born 1927)
 August 5 - Gerald Cohen (born 1941)
 September 13 - William Alston (born 1921)
 October 30 - Claude Lévi-Strauss (born 1908)
 December 4 - Stephen Toulmin (born 1922)

References 

Philosophy
21st-century philosophy
Philosophy by year